Daniel William May (born 19 November 1988) is an English footballer who plays for Amersham Town. He plays mostly as a right back.

Career
May came through Northampton Town's youth system and agreed a professional contract in April 2007. He made his first team début on 21 April 2007 in a 1–0 win over Chesterfield. He made two more appearances at the end of the 2006–07 season. He made three subsequent appearances in the 2007–08 season, the last against Leeds United on 5 January 2008. He was released at the end of the 2007–08 season.

He dropped six divisions, joining Wivenhoe Town, in August 2008. He signed for Enfield Town in February 2009. He joined Hemel Hempstead Town for the start of the 2009–10 season.

In August 2015, May was with Southern League Division One Central side Kings Langley. He has since moved on to Royston Town.

In the summer of 2022, May signed with Amersham Town.

References

1988 births
English footballers
Living people
English Football League players
Isthmian League players
Southern Football League players
Northampton Town F.C. players
Wivenhoe Town F.C. players
Enfield Town F.C. players
Hemel Hempstead Town F.C. players
Kings Langley F.C. players
Amersham Town F.C. players
Association football defenders